Thornthwaite is a small village in the Harrogate district of North Yorkshire, England.

Padside Beck is crossed by a packhorse bridge thought to date from the 15th century.  It was probably on a packhorse route from Ilkley to Fountains Abbey, and may have been constructed by the abbey.  The bridge is a Scheduled Ancient Monument.

Thornthwaite is the largest settlement in the civil parish of Thornthwaite with Padside, historically a township in the ancient parish of Hampsthwaite. It became a separate civil parish in 1866. The population of the parish is estimated at 220, In the 2011 census the population of the parish was included with Thruscross, and the total of the two parishes was 312.

References

External links 

Villages in North Yorkshire
Nidderdale